The East Range is a mountain range in the Great Basin region, located in Pershing County, Nevada. The name is locational.

References

Mountain ranges of Nevada
Mountain ranges of the Great Basin
Mountain ranges of Pershing County, Nevada